Lippincott's Monthly Magazine was a 19th-century literary magazine published in Philadelphia from 1868 to 1915, when it relocated to New York to become McBride's Magazine. It merged with Scribner's Magazine in 1916.

Lippincott's published original works, general articles, and literary criticism. It is indexed in the Reader's Guide Retrospective database, and the full-text of many issues is available online from Project Gutenberg, and in various commercial databases such as the American Periodicals Series from ProQuest.

Lippincott's was published by J. B. Lippincott of Philadelphia until 1914, then by McBride, Nast & Co. There were 96 semi-annual volumes. From 1881 to 1885 they were issued as vols. 1 to 10 "New Series" or "N.S." (see image) and bound such as "Old Series, Vol. XXVII – New Series, Vol. I" (January to June 1881) but the old series was resumed with January 1887 issued as volume 37, number 1. Joseph Berg Esenwein was editor from 1905 to 1914.

Early names
 1868–1870: Lippincott's Magazine of Literature, Science and Education
 1871–1885: Lippincott's Magazine of Popular Literature and Science

Notable authors
Lippincott's published several notable authors of the day, including:
Gertrude Atherton: Doomswoman (1892)
Willa Cather
Florence Earle Coates, Philadelphia poet whose poetry was featured nearly five dozen times in Lippincott's between 1885 and 1915.
Arthur Conan Doyle: The Sign of the Four (February 1890)
Paul Laurence Dunbar: The Sport of the Gods (1901)
Rudyard Kipling: The Light that Failed (January 1891)
Emma Lazarus (over 40 poems in the 1870s)
Louis Sullivan: The Tall Office Building Artistically Considered (1896)
Anthony Trollope: The Vicar of Bullhampton (serialized starting in July 1869)
Oscar Wilde: The Picture of Dorian Gray (July 1890)

Notable editors
1886–1894: Joseph Marshall Stoddart

References

Further reading
Publication history from OCLC's WorldCat Database and American Periodicals Series (APS) Online.
Science in the Nineteenth-Century Periodicals

External links

 Lippincott's at Project Gutenberg
 UPenn Library listing of online volumes

Monthly magazines published in the United States
Defunct literary magazines published in the United States
Magazines established in 1868
Magazines disestablished in 1916
Magazines published in Philadelphia